Bismarckburg was a colonial station in the German colony of Togo. 
It was named after the founder of the German empire, Otto von Bismarck.

History

The station was founded in June 1888 by the explorer Ludwig Wolf.
It was one of the first permanently inhabited European stations in the interior of West Africa and was located on the 750 meter high Adadoberg.
In the years 1889–90 the station was headed by Erich Kling and was the starting point for several expeditions to explore the hinterland and to expand German influence in the area. 
Kling and his successor Richard Büttner had a palisade fence built for fortification. 
At that time, the station consisted of nine adobe buildings arranged in a rectangle.
The station was manned by two Germans - the station manager and a mechanic. 
Outside the palisades were agricultural areas on which cultivation trials with European crops and tropical crops were carried out. 
Around 1900 a cola and coffee plantation was still in operation.

The Imperial Commissariat under Jesko von Puttkamer was skeptical of the station due to its remoteness and economic inefficiency. 
Instead of directing trade to the coast of German Togo, it strengthened the existing connections to the British Gold Coast. 
As early as 30 June 1894, the status as a European station was revoked. 
The colonial station was still under the control of a German district manager in Kete Krachi as a secondary station until 1914. 
It remained economically important as African traders came to the area to buy rubber.

Notes

Sources

Weblinks

 Photo of the Bismarckburg Station in Togo
 Bismarckburg, Großer deutscher Kolonialatlas, Archivführer Deutsche Kolonialgeschichte
 Mèhèza Kalibani: Zwischen "Bismarckburg" und "Nachtigalplatz". Die Kolonie als politisches Symbol des Kaiserreichs anhand der 'Musterkolonie' Togo, Munich, GRIN Verlag 2019, https://www.grin.com/document/477611.

Further reading

Bismarckburg. In: Heinrich Schnee (Hrsg.): Deutsches Kolonial-Lexikon. Quelle & Meyer, Leipzig 1920, Band I, S. 217 (online).
Meyers Enzyklopädisches Lexikon.
Der große Weltatlas, Kartographisches Institut Bertelsmann, Gütersloh 1963.
Peter Sebald: Togo 1884–1914. Akademie-Verlag, Berlin 1988, S. 82ff

Populated places in Togo